Serra Malagueta is a mountain range located in the northern part of the island of Santiago, Cape Verde. At 1064 m elevation, it is highest point of northern Santiago. The mountain range is protected as the Serra Malagueta Natural Park (Parque Natural de Serra Malagueta), that was established on February 24, 2005 and covers 774 hectares. The natural park is situated in the municipalities Tarrafal, São Miguel and Santa Catarina. The summit is in São Miguel, south of the Ribeira Principal valley. The Serra Malagueta formation is of volcanic origin, and was formed between 2.9 and 2.4 million years ago.

Flora

The park features about 124 species of plants, of which 28 are endemic species or subspecies. The endemic plants are threatened by invasive species from outside the park including Lantana camara (lantana) and Furcraea foetida (giant cabuya). Limonium lobinii (carqueja de Santiago) is only found in this park.

Fauna
In the park there are 19 species of birds, of which eight are endemic. Many of these are endangered, including Ardea purpurea bournei (Bourne's heron), Acrocephalus brevipennis (Cape Verde warbler) and Cape Verde buzzard (Buteo bannermani). Four species of mammals are found, including one species of monkey. Six species of reptiles are found (four are endemic) and one endemic amphibian species. Invertebrates such as butterflies are found including Acherontia atropos and Papilio demodocus; one beetle is endangered: Diplognatha gagates.

See also
 List of mountains in Cape Verde

Notes

External links

Eco Serra Malagueta/Serra Malagueta Natural Park
Wildlife of Serra Malagueta
Serra Malagueta at the IUCN page

Malagueta
Geography of Santiago, Cape Verde
Santa Catarina, Cape Verde
São Miguel, Cape Verde